The Muumyangan (Khalkha-Mongolian: Муумянган/Muumyangan) are a sub-ethnic group of the Southern Mongols in Darhan Muminggan United Banner, China. The name probably means "bad (muu) thousand (myangan)."

See also 
 Administrative divisions of Northern Yuan Dynasty
 Demographics of Mongolia
 Demographics of China
 List of medieval Mongolian tribes and clans
 List of Mongolian monarchs
 Mongols in China
 Southern Mongolian dialect
 Western Mongols

Mongols
Southern Mongols